The following outline is provided as an overview of and topical guide to Micronesia:

The Federated States of Micronesia – island nation located in the North Pacific Ocean, north of Papua New Guinea.  The country is a sovereign state in free association with the United States. The Federated States of Micronesia were formerly part of the Trust Territory of the Pacific Islands, a United Nations Trust Territory under US administration. In 1979 they adopted a constitution, and in 1986 independence was attained under a Compact of Free Association with the United States. Present concerns include large-scale unemployment, overfishing, and dependence on U.S. aid.  The Federated States of Micronesia are located in the region known as Micronesia, which consists of hundreds of small islands divided in seven territories. The term Micronesia may refer to the Federated States or to the region as a whole, even though the lack of a central government makes it a sovereign group of states, not a country.

General reference 

 Pronunciation: 
 Common English country name: Micronesia, Federated States
 Official English country name: The Federated States of Micronesia
 Common endonym(s):  
 Official endonym(s):  
 Adjectival(s): Micronesian
 Demonym(s):
 Etymology: Name of Micronesia
 ISO country codes: FM, FSM, 583
 ISO region codes: See ISO 3166-2:FM
 Internet country code top-level domain: .fm

Geography of the Federated States of Micronesia 

Geography of the Federated States of Micronesia
 Federated States of Micronesia is: an island country
 Location:
 Northern Hemisphere and Eastern Hemisphere
 Pacific Ocean
 North Pacific
 Oceania
 Micronesia (the region)
 Caroline Islands
 Time zones:
 Time in the Federated States of Micronesia
 Kosrae and Pohnpei – UTC+11
 Yap and Chuuk – UTC+10
 Extreme points of the Federated States of Micronesia
 High:  Nanlaud on Pohnpei 
 Low:  North Pacific Ocean 0 m
 Land boundaries:  none
 Coastline:  North Pacific Ocean 6,112 km
 Population of the Federated States of Micronesia: 107,862 people (2007 estimate) - 181st most populous country
 Area of the Federated States of Micronesia:  - 188th largest country
 Atlas of the Federated States of Micronesia

Environment of the Federated States of Micronesia 

 Climate of the Federated States of Micronesia: Tropical rainforest climate
 Renewable energy in the Federated States of Micronesia
 Geology of the Federated States of Micronesia
 Protected areas of the Federated States of Micronesia
 Yela Ka Forest
 Wildlife of the Federated States of Micronesia
 Fauna of the Federated States of Micronesia
 Birds of the Federated States of Micronesia
 Butterflies of the Federated States of Micronesia
 Mammals of the Federated States of Micronesia

Natural geographic features of the Federated States of Micronesia 
 Islands of the Federated States of Micronesia
 Lakes of the Federated States of Micronesia
 Mountains of the Federated States of Micronesia
 Volcanoes in the Federated States of Micronesia
 Rivers of the Federated States of Micronesia
 Waterfalls of the Federated States of Micronesia
 Valleys of the Federated States of Micronesia
 World Heritage Sites in the Federated States of Micronesia
 Nan Madol

Regions and places of the Federated States of Micronesia 

 National Register of Historic Places listings in the Federated States of Micronesia

Ecoregions of the Federated States of Micronesia 

 Carolines tropical moist forests
 Yap tropical dry forests

Administrative divisions of the Federated States of Micronesia 
Administrative divisions of the Federated States of Micronesia

 States of the Federated States of Micronesia
Chuuk
 Kosrae
 Pohnpei
 Yap
 Islands of the Federated States of Micronesia
 Fono, Federated States of Micronesia

Municipalities of the Federated States of Micronesia 

 Capital of the Federated States of Micronesia: Palikir
 Cities and towns of the Federated States of Micronesia
 Tol, Federated States of Micronesia

Demography of the Federated States of Micronesia 

Demographics of the Federated States of Micronesia

Government and politics of the Federated States of Micronesia 

Politics of the Federated States of Micronesia
 Form of government: federal assembly-independent representative democratic republic
 Capital of the Federated States of Micronesia: Palikir
 Elections in the Federated States of Micronesia
 Political parties in the Federated States of Micronesia

Branches of the government of the Federated States of Micronesia 

Government of the Federated States of Micronesia

Executive branch of the government of the Federated States of Micronesia 

 Head of state: President of the Federated States of Micronesia,
 Vice President of the Federated States of Micronesia
 Head of government: President of the Federated States of Micronesia,
 Vice President of the Federated States of Micronesia
 Cabinet of the Federated States of Micronesia
 Department of Education (Federated States of Micronesia)
 Department of Transportation, Communications and Infrastructure (Federated States of Micronesia)

Legislative branch of the government of the Federated States of Micronesia 

 Congress of the Federated States of Micronesia

Judicial branch of the government of the Federated States of Micronesia 

Court system of the Federated States of Micronesia
 Supreme Court of the Federated States of Micronesia
 Chief Justice of the Federated States of Micronesia

Foreign relations of the Federated States of Micronesia 

Foreign relations of the Federated States of Micronesia
 Federated States of Micronesia and the United Nations
 Diplomatic missions in the Federated States of Micronesia
 List of ambassadors of Australia to the Federated States of Micronesia
 List of ambassadors of China to the Federated States of Micronesia
 Diplomatic missions of the Federated States of Micronesia
 List of ambassadors of the Federated States of Micronesia to China
 List of ambassadors of the Federated States of Micronesia to the United States
 List of ambassadors of the United States to the Federated States of Micronesia
 Australia–Federated States of Micronesia relations
 China–Federated States of Micronesia relations
 India–Federated States of Micronesia relations
 Israel–Federated States of Micronesia relations
 Marshall Islands–Federated States of Micronesia relations
 Marshall Islands–Federated States of Micronesia Maritime Boundary Treaty
 Federated States of Micronesia–Palau relations
 Federated States of Micronesia–United States relations

International organization membership 

The Federated States of Micronesia is a member of:

 African, Caribbean, and Pacific Group of States (ACP)
 Asian Development Bank (ADB)
 Alliance of Small Island States (AOSIS)
 Food and Agriculture Organization (FAO)
 Group of 77 (G77)
 International Bank for Reconstruction and Development (IBRD)
 International Civil Aviation Organization (ICAO)
 International Development Association (IDA)
 International Federation of Red Cross and Red Crescent Societies (IFRCS)
 International Finance Corporation (IFC)
 International Monetary Fund (IMF)
 International Olympic Committee (IOC)
 International Red Cross and Red Crescent Movement (ICRM)

 International Telecommunication Union (ITU)
 International Telecommunications Satellite Organization (ITSO)
 Multilateral Investment Guarantee Agency (MIGA)
 Organisation for the Prohibition of Chemical Weapons (OPCW)
 Pacific Islands Forum (PIF)
 Secretariat of the Pacific Community (SPC)
 South Pacific Regional Trade and Economic Cooperation Agreement (Sparteca)
 United Nations (UN)
 United Nations Conference on Trade and Development (UNCTAD)
 United Nations Educational, Scientific, and Cultural Organization (UNESCO)
 World Health Organization (WHO)
 World Meteorological Organization (WMO)

Law and order in the Federated States of Micronesia 

Law of the Federated States of Micronesia
 Abortion in the Federated States of Micronesia
 Cannabis in the Federated States of Micronesia
 Constitution of the Federated States of Micronesia
 Crime in the Federated States of Micronesia
 Human trafficking in the Federated States of Micronesia
 Human rights in the Federated States of Micronesia
 LGBT rights in the Federated States of Micronesia
 Freedom of religion in the Federated States of Micronesia
 Law enforcement in the Federated States of Micronesia

Military of the Federated States of Micronesia 
 Compact of Free Association#Military provisions
 Island Soldier

Local government in the Federated States of Micronesia 
Local government in the Federated States of Micronesia

History of the Federated States of Micronesia 
History of the Federated States of Micronesia
 Timeline of the history of the Federated States of Micronesia
 2018 in the Federated States of Micronesia
 2020 in the Federated States of Micronesia
 2021 in the Federated States of Micronesia
 2022 in the Federated States of Micronesia
 National Register of Historic Places listings in the Federated States of Micronesia
 Postage stamps and postal history of the Federated States of Micronesia

Culture of the Federated States of Micronesia 

Culture of the Federated States of Micronesia
 Architecture of the Federated States of Micronesia
 Cuisine of the Federated States of Micronesia
 Festivals in the Federated States of Micronesia
 Languages of the Federated States of Micronesia
 Libraries in the Federated States of Micronesia
 Media in the Federated States of Micronesia
 Museums in the Federated States of Micronesia
 National symbols of the Federated States of Micronesia
 Flag of the Federated States of Micronesia
 National anthem of the Federated States of Micronesia
 Seal of the Federated States of Micronesia
 People of the Federated States of Micronesia
 Public holidays in the Federated States of Micronesia
 Records of the Federated States of Micronesia
 Religion in the Federated States of Micronesia
 Christianity in the Federated States of Micronesia
 Apostolic Nunciature to the Federated States of Micronesia
 The Church of Jesus Christ of Latter-day Saints in the Federated States of Micronesia
 Hinduism in the Federated States of Micronesia
 Islam in the Federated States of Micronesia
 Judaism in the Federated States of Micronesia
 Sikhism in the Federated States of Micronesia
 Scouting in the Federated States of Micronesia
 Time in the Federated States of Micronesia
 Women in the Federated States of Micronesia
 World Heritage Sites in the Federated States of Micronesia: None

Art in the Federated States of Micronesia 

 Art in the Federated States of Micronesia
 Cinema of the Federated States of Micronesia
 Dance in the Federated States of Micronesia
 Literature of the Federated States of Micronesia
 Music of the Federated States of Micronesia
 Television in the Federated States of Micronesia
 Theatre in the Federated States of Micronesia

Sports in the Federated States of Micronesia 

Sports in the Federated States of Micronesia
 Rugby union in the Federated States of Micronesia
 Federated States of Micronesia at the 2017 Asian Indoor and Martial Arts Games
 Federated States of Micronesia at the 2017 World Championships in Athletics
 Federated States of Micronesia at the 2011 Pacific Games
 Federated States of Micronesia at the 2015 Pacific Games
 Federated States of Micronesia at the 2019 Pacific Games

Athletics in the Federated States of Micronesia 
 List of Federated States of Micronesia records in athletics
 Federated States of Micronesia Athletic Association
 Federated States of Micronesia at the 2009 World Championships in Athletics
 Federated States of Micronesia at the 2011 World Championships in Athletics
 Federated States of Micronesia at the 2013 World Championships in Athletics
 Federated States of Micronesia at the 2015 World Championships in Athletics
 Federated States of Micronesia at the 2019 World Athletics Championships
 Federated States of Micronesia at the 2022 World Athletics Championships

Football in the Federated States of Micronesia 
Football in the Federated States of Micronesia
 Federated States of Micronesia Football Association
 List of football clubs in the Federated States of Micronesia
 Federated States of Micronesia national football team
 Federated States of Micronesia national under-23 football team

Federated States of Micronesia at the Olympics 
Federated States of Micronesia at the Olympics
 Federated States of Micronesia Olympic Committee
 Federated States of Micronesia at the 2000 Summer Olympics
 Federated States of Micronesia at the 2004 Summer Olympics
 Federated States of Micronesia at the 2008 Summer Olympics
 Federated States of Micronesia at the 2010 Summer Youth Olympics
 Federated States of Micronesia at the 2012 Summer Olympics
 Federated States of Micronesia at the 2014 Summer Youth Olympics
 Federated States of Micronesia at the 2016 Summer Olympics
 Federated States of Micronesia at the 2018 Summer Youth Olympics
 Federated States of Micronesia at the 2020 Summer Olympics
 List of flag bearers for the Federated States of Micronesia at the Olympics
 List of Federated States of Micronesia records in Olympic weightlifting

Federated States of Micronesia at the World Aquatics Championships 
 Federated States of Micronesia at the 2011 World Aquatics Championships
 Federated States of Micronesia at the 2013 World Aquatics Championships
 Federated States of Micronesia at the 2015 World Aquatics Championships
 Federated States of Micronesia at the 2017 World Aquatics Championships
 Federated States of Micronesia at the 2019 World Aquatics Championships
 Federated States of Micronesia at the 2022 World Aquatics Championships

Economy and infrastructure of the Federated States of Micronesia 

Economy of the Federated States of Micronesia
 Economic rank, by nominal GDP (2007): 184th (one hundred and eighty fourth)
 Agriculture in the Federated States of Micronesia
 Aquaculture in the Federated States of Micronesia
 Banking in the Federated States of Micronesia
 National Bank of the Federated States of Micronesia
 Communications in the Federated States of Micronesia
 Telecommunications in the Federated States of Micronesia
 Internet in the Federated States of Micronesia
 List of radio stations in the Federated States of Micronesia
 Telephone numbers in the Federated States of Micronesia
 Postage stamps and postal history of the Federated States of Micronesia
 Companies of the Federated States of Micronesia
 Currency of the Federated States of Micronesia: Dollar
 ISO 4217: USD
 Energy in the Federated States of Micronesia
 Energy policy of the Federated States of Micronesia
 Oil industry in the Federated States of Micronesia
 Hospitals in the Federated States of Micronesia
 Mining in the Federated States of Micronesia
 Tourism in the Federated States of Micronesia
 Trade unions in the Federated States of Micronesia
 Transportation in the Federated States of Micronesia
 Federated States of Micronesia Stock Exchange

Education in the Federated States of Micronesia 

Education in the Federated States of Micronesia

Health in the Federated States of Micronesia 

Health in the Federated States of Micronesia
 COVID-19 pandemic in the Federated States of Micronesia

Infrastructure of the Federated States of Micronesia

 Health care in the Federated States of Micronesia
 Transportation in the Federated States of Micronesia
 Lighthouses in the Federated States of Micronesia
 Airports in the Federated States of Micronesia
 Rail transport in the Federated States of Micronesia: none
 Vehicular transport in the Federated States of Micronesia
 Roads in the Federated States of Micronesia
 Vehicle registration plates of the Federated States of Micronesia
 Water supply and sanitation in the Federated States of Micronesia

See also 

 Federated States of Micronesia
 Index of Federated States of Micronesia-related articles
 Index of Federated States of Micronesia-related articles
 List of Federated States of Micronesia-related topics
 List of international rankings
 Member state of the United Nations
 Outline of geography
 Outline of Oceania

References

External links

 Government
 Government of the Federated States of Micronesia

 General
 Jane's Federated States of Micronesia Home Page
 Trust Territory of the Pacific Archives at the University of Hawaii
 Pacific Islands Legal Information Institute - Federated States of Micronesia
 Nature.org - Micronesia environmental conservation
 
 myMicronesia.com Online resource center about the islands of Micronesia. Provides free listings and links to all Micronesian businesses, as well as civic, cultural, health and educational organizations.
 Habele is US-based charity that serves educational needs in the more remote atolls of Micronesia. "Habele Fund Awards FSM Scholarships" Pacific Magazine Online, August 4, 2007.

 News media
 The Yap Networker - Yap's news source

 Travel
 Travel Overview of Micronesia

 Maps
 Nan Madol islet complex Provides computer based reconstruction of the main islets and features.

 
 
Federated States of Micronesia